Nothing Without You may refer to:

Albums
 Nothing Without You (Mel Tormé and Cleo Laine album), 1991
 Nothing Without You (Smokie Norful album) or the title song, 2004
 Nothing Without You (EP), by the Narrative, 2010

Songs
 "Nothing Without You" (song), by Ami Suzuki, 1999
 "Nothing Without You", by AB6IX from 6ixense, 2019
 "Nothing Without You", by Boyzone from Brother, 2010
 "Nothing Without You", by Brandy and Sy'rai from the film Cheaper by the Dozen, 2022
 "Nothing Without You", by Fleetwood Mac from Time, 1995
 "Nothing Without You", by Mando Diao from Give Me Fire!, 2009
 "Nothing Without You", by Olly Murs from Never Been Better, 2014
 "Nothing Without You", by Simon Webbe from Smile, 2017
 "Nothing Without You", by the Weeknd from Starboy, 2016